State Route 226 (SR 226) is a state highway located in southern Kennebec County, Maine. SR 226 directly connects the two towns and functions as part of a bypass of Augusta to and from points east. The route is locally known as Windsor Street in Randolph and Togus Road in Chelsea.

Route description
The route heads northeast out of Randolph as Windsor Street and crosses into the town of Chelsea as Togus Road. SR 226 passes through the town center and terminates at SR 17 (Eastern Avenue).

History
SR 226 was designated in 1934 to serve what is now Togus VA Medical Center. It was first signed the following year. It was designated over entirely new routing and its alignment has not changed since.

Junction list

References

External links

Floodgap Roadgap's RoadsAroundME: Maine State Route 226

226
Transportation in Kennebec County, Maine